Alope  was in Greek mythology a mortal woman, the daughter of Cercyon, known for her great beauty.

Mythology 
Poseidon, in the guise of a kingfisher, seduced Alope, his granddaughter through Cercyon, and from the union she gave birth to Hippothoon.  Alope left the infant in the open to die of exposure, but a passing mare suckled the child until it was found by shepherds, who fell into a dispute as to who was to have the beautiful royal attire of the boy.  The case was brought before Cercyon, who, on recognizing by the dress whose child the boy was, ordered Alope to be imprisoned in order to be put to death, and her child to be exposed again. The latter was fed and found in the same manner as before, and the shepherds called him Hippothoon. The body of Alope was changed by Poseidon into a spring, which bore the same name.

The town of Alope, in ancient Thessaly, was believed to have derived its name from her, where, however, Philonides speaks of an Alope as a daughter of Actor. There was a monument of Alope on the road from Eleusis to Megara, on the spot where she was believed to have been killed by her father.

Notes

References 

 Aristophanes, Birds. The Complete Greek Drama. vol. 2. Eugene O'Neill, Jr. New York. Random House. 1938. Online version at the Perseus Digital Library.
 Aristophanes, Aristophanes Comoediae edited by F.W. Hall and W.M. Geldart, vol. 2. F.W. Hall and W.M. Geldart. Oxford. Clarendon Press, Oxford. 1907. Greek text available at the Perseus Digital Library.
 Gaius Julius Hyginus, Fabulae from The Myths of Hyginus translated and edited by Mary Grant. University of Kansas Publications in Humanistic Studies. Online version at the Topos Text Project.
 Pausanias, Description of Greece with an English Translation by W.H.S. Jones, Litt.D., and H.A. Ormerod, M.A., in 4 Volumes. Cambridge, MA, Harvard University Press; London, William Heinemann Ltd. 1918. Online version at the Perseus Digital Library
 Pausanias, Graeciae Descriptio. 3 vols. Leipzig, Teubner. 1903.  Greek text available at the Perseus Digital Library.
 Stephanus of Byzantium, Stephani Byzantii Ethnicorum quae supersunt, edited by August Meineike (1790-1870), published 1849. A few entries from this important ancient handbook of place names have been translated by Brady Kiesling. Online version at the Topos Text Project.

Women of Poseidon
Mortal parents of demigods in classical mythology
Metamorphoses into bodies of water in Greek mythology
Women in Greek mythology
Eleusinian characters in Greek mythology